The Taiping Heavenly Kingdom is a Chinese television series based on the events of the Taiping Rebellion and the rise and fall of the Taiping Heavenly Kingdom in the late Qing dynasty. The 48-episode series was first broadcast on CCTV in China in 2000. The series was also broadcast on STAR Chinese Channel in Taiwan and on ATV in Hong Kong.

Cast

 Gao Lancun as Hong Xiuquan
 Zhang Zhizhong as Yang Xiuqing
 He Yongsheng as Feng Yunshan
 Han Zaifeng as Xiao Chaogui
 Liu Bing as Wei Changhui
 Wang Shihuai as Shi Dakai
 Lu Yong as Lin Fengxiang
 Yu De'an as Luo Dagang
 Lin Qiang as Qin Rigang
 Shi Xiaohong as Li Xiucheng
 Huang He as Chen Yucheng
 Yang Tongshu as Fu Shanxiang
 Wang Jinghua as Hong Xuanjiao
 Li Jianqun as Su Sanniang
 Hu Tiange as Cheng Lingnan
 Jin Yuting as Zeng Wanmei
 Zhou Xun as Shi Yiyang
 Li Ming as Yang Fuqing
 Wang Gang as Li Kaifang
 Lan Lan as Yimei
 Peng Jun as Zeng Shuiyuan
 Chen Baojia as Meng De'en
 Han Zhenhua as Chen Chengrong
 Zhou Yilun as Zhou Xineng
 Song Rixin as Hong Daquan
 Hu Zhaofeng as Wei Jun
 Yang Jing as Wei Yujuan
 Zhang Jie as Li Shouchun
 Lu Wei as Zeng Xian
 Zhao Jingwen as Hu Yihuang
 Cai Di as Hou Qianfang
 Yang Zhijiang as Hong Renfa
 Hao Tienan as Hong Renda
 Li Yansong as Hou Shuqian
 Guo Tao as Wang Yizhong
 Xu Honghao as Tan Shaoguang
 Pan Jie as Xie Manmei
 Shi Zonghong as Chen Zongyang
 Su Keshi as Zhu Yidian
 Liu Haili as Lai Hanying
 Hu Xiaoting as Hu Yurong
 Li Quanzhong as Wang Haixiang
 Sun Deli as Jiang Yuanba
 Liang Jiaxing as Shi Xiangzhen
 Du Jun as Siqin
 Yang Jimin as Huang Yukun
 Sun Feihu as Zeng Guofan
 Liu Yubin as Zuo Zongtang
 Hou Tianlai as Xianfeng Emperor
 Gai Lili as Empress Dowager Cixi
 Xue Zhongrui as Sushun
 Zhao Yi as Prince Gong
 Zhu Yidan as Saishang'e
 Bao Si as Xiang Rong
 Zhang Guangzheng as Yang Fuzai
 Xu Maomao as Sengge Rinchen
 Cui Dai as Zeng Guoquan
 Hou Yongsheng as Zeng Tianyang
 Zhang Xiaobo as Wulantai
 Li Zheshi as Guo Kunchou
 Liu Gang as Guo Songchou
 Ye Qinglin as Zhang Liangji
 Wu Honghou as Luo Bingzhang

Production
115 million yuan of the total budget of 150 million yuan was used for constructing the filming set, which is located in Nanhai District, Foshan, Guangdong.

See also
 Twilight of a Nation

References

External links
  Taiping Tianguo on Sina.com
  Taiping Tianguo at the Chinese Movie Database
  Taiping Tianguo page on ATV's website
  Transcript of an interview with the history consultants of Taiping Tianguo

2000 Chinese television series debuts
2000 Chinese television series endings
Television series set in the Qing dynasty
Mandarin-language television shows
Chinese historical television series
Television shows set in Guangxi
Television shows set in Nanjing